Aum is the second studio album by krautrock composer Deuter. It was released in 1972 on Kuckuck Schallplatten.

Track listing

Personnel
Adapted from the Aum liner notes.
 Deuter – flute, guitar,  synthesizer, musical arrangement, production
 Manfred Manke – photography, art direction

Release history

References

External links 
 

1972 albums
Deuter albums
Kuckuck Schallplatten albums
Esoteric Recordings albums
Cherry Red Records albums